The Guernsey Dairy Milk Depot is a historic building in Boise, Idaho.  It was placed on the National Register of Historic Places in 1982.

The Depot was built in 1937 by L. S. Mallory to designs by architects Tourtellotte & Hummel.  It is a rare example of Spanish Colonial Revival architecture in their portfolio.  It was built to house both commercial and light industrial operations.  It has been occupied as offices since at least the 1980s.

References

Buildings and structures in Boise, Idaho
Commercial buildings completed in 1937
National Register of Historic Places in Boise, Idaho
Spanish Colonial Revival architecture in the United States
Dairy buildings in the United States